Nam River may refer to:

Nam River (Burma), a river in Burma
Nam River (Korea), a river tributary of the Nakdong River, South Korea

Other 
Nam Hinboun River
Nam Pang River
Nam Song River
Nam Xan River

See also 
Nam (disambiguation)